Cycloclasticus is a genus in the phylum Pseudomonadota (Bacteria).

Etymology
The name Cycloclasticus derives from:Greek noun kuklos, circle or ring; New Latin adjective clasticus -a -um (from Greek adjective klastos -ē -on, broken in pieces), breaking; New Latin masculine gender noun cycloclasticus, ring-breaker.

Species
The genus contains a single species, namely C. pugetii ( Dyksterhouse et al. 1995,  (Type species of the genus).; New Latin genitive case masculine gender noun pugetii, of Puget, named in honor of Peter Puget, a British naval officer who participated in the Vancouver Expedition and for whom Puget Sound was named.) Other candidate species, e.g., "C. spirillensus," have not been formally recognized.  "C. spirillenus" is notable for its spirillum morphology.

See also
 Bacterial taxonomy
 Microbiology

References 

Bacteria genera
Thiotrichales